Missionary Man is British comic strip. It debuted in the Judge Dredd Megazine in May 1993 with the introductory 7-page story "Salvation At The Last Chance Saloon", illustrated by Frank Quitely. It established that tall Preacher Cain rides the Cursed Earth performing "special sermons" in the radiation-poisoned towns, tutoring the damned with a bible and his guns. In this first outing, having educated and decimated a table of gambling mutant heavyweights he rides into the sunset, tossing a bible at the surviving townspeople - which contains a thermonuclear explosive.

In 1998 the strip transitioned to the weekly 2000 AD.

Stories

All written by Gordon Rennie:

Missionary Man:
 "Salvation at the Last Chance Saloon" (with Frank Quitely, in Judge Dredd Megazine (vol. 2) #29, 1993)
 "A Town Called Intolerance" (with Frank Quitely, in Judge Dredd Megazine (vol. 2) #30, 1993)
 "Legend of the Unholy Drinker" (with Garry Marshall, in Judge Dredd Megazine (vol. 2) #43, 1993)
 "Bad Moon Rising" (with Frank Quitely, in Judge Dredd Megazine (vol. 2) #50-55, 1994)
 "Season of the Witch" (with Garry Marshall, in Judge Dredd Megazine (vol. 2) #56-57, 1994)
 "Sanctuary" (with Sean Longcroft, in Judge Dredd Megazine (vol. 2) #58-59, 1994)
 "The Undertaker Cometh" (with Simon Davis, in Judge Dredd Mega-Special #7, 1994)
 "Treasure of the Sierra Murder" (with Simon Davis, in Judge Dredd Megazine (vol. 2) #63-66, 1994)
 "Medicine Show" (with Jon Beeston, in Judge Dredd Megazine (vol. 2) #81, 1995)
 "Nightriders" (with Jamie Grant, in Judge Dredd Megazine (vol. 2) #82-83, 1995)
 "Mississippi Burning" (with Simon Davis, in Judge Dredd Megazine (vol. 3) #1-3, 1995)
 "Crusader" (with Charles Gillespie, in Judge Dredd Megazine (vol. 3) #17, 1996)
 "The Big Sleazy" (with Simon Davis, in Judge Dredd Megazine (vol. 3) #18-20, 1996)
 "Night of the Hunter" (in Judge Dredd Megazine (vol. 3) #26, 1996)
 "Mortal Combat" (in Judge Dredd Megazine (vol. 3) #27, 1996)
 "Juggernaut" (with Henry Flint, in Judge Dredd Megazine (vol. 3) #34, 1997)
 "The Shootist" (with Christian Bravery, in Judge Dredd Megazine (vol. 3) #36-37, 1997)
 "Storm Warnings" (with Trevor Hairsine, in Judge Dredd Megazine (vol. 3) #38, 1998)
 "Missionary Man: Prologue" (with Simon Davis, in 2000 AD #1091, 1998)
 "Mardi Gras" (with Alex Ronald, in 2000 AD #1092-1096, 1998)
 "Goin' South" (with Alex Ronald, in 2000 AD #1118-1123, 1998)
 "Apocrypha" (with Henry Flint, in 2000 AD #1124, 1998)
 "The Promised Land" (with Alex Ronald (1-3, 8-9), Trevor Hairsine (4), Colin MacNeil (5-7), Simon Davis (10-12), and Dean Ormston (13-15), in 2000 AD #1174-1188, 2000)
 "Mark of the Beast" (with Jesus Redondo, in 2000 AD #1201-1204, 2000)
 "Silence" (with Wayne Reynolds, in Judge Dredd Megazine (vol. 3) #77, 2001)
 "Place of the Dead" (with John Ridgway, in Judge Dredd Megazine (vol. 4) #9-13, 2002)

The character also makes a cameo appearance in the Judge Dredd novel Cursed Earth Asylum, by David Bishop (Virgin Books, December 1993).

Collected editions
Some of the stories have been collected into a number of trade paperbacks:

 Bad Moon Rising (112 pages, Rebellion Developments, August 2011) collects:
 Missionary Man (80 pages, Titan Books, June 2002) collects:
 "Salvation At The Last Chance Saloon"
 "A Town Called Intolerance"
 "Legend of the Unholy Drinker"
 "Bad Moon Rising"
 "Season of The Witch"
 "Sanctuary"
 "The Undertaker Cometh"

References
 Missionary Man at Barney

Comics characters introduced in 1993
Characters created by Frank Quitely
Judge Dredd characters